Kabete is a neighbourhood that located along the border of Nairobi and Kiambu counties. It is located less than  outside of the capital city of Nairobi. According to the 2009 census, the Kabete area has a population of 140,427.  As part of the Nairobi Highlands area, the region's environment remains unpolluted.

Anthropologist Louis Leakey was born in Kabete. His nickname was Giteru and hence the reference Kabete gwa Giteru (Meaning Kabete, Giteru's place). A school by the name Mary Leakey High School, found in the Lower Kabete area remains as part of his family's legacy.

References

Kiambu County
Populated places in Central Province (Kenya)